Kate Levering (born January 3, 1979) is an American actress and dancer. She was nominated for a Tony Award for her role in the  2001 musical 42nd Street. She is best known for her role as Kim Kaswell in the Lifetime comedy-drama series Drop Dead Diva.

Life and career
Levering was born in Sacramento, California. Levering attended El Camino Fundamental High School, where she took part in school musicals and dance classes before graduating in 1997 and leaving for New York City to pursue a career on Broadway. In 2001 she was cast as Peggy Sawyer in the revival of 42nd Street. She was nominated for the Tony Award for Best Featured Actress in a Musical category and won the Fred Astaire Award for Best Female Dancer for her tap dancing in the show. She only performed the role on Broadway for a short three-month period, and is featured on the cast album, but is not taped for Lincoln Center Archives.

Levering left 42nd Street to star in the notorious Broadway flop Thou Shalt Not, composed by Harry Connick, Jr., and choreographed by Susan Stroman.

On television, Levering has made guest appearances on shows such as Home Improvement, Law & Order: Special Victims Unit, Cold Case (episode: "Dog Day Afternoons") and Witchblade. In 2002, she played the role of Jeanne Martin in the TV movie Martin and Lewis, starring Sean Hayes and Jeremy Northam. In 2004 she played whip-smart attorney Veronica Carter on the UPN series Kevin Hill, starring Taye Diggs. Although critically acclaimed, the show was canceled in 2005 after only one season. Kate has had guest roles in CSI: Miami ("The Score" (2006)), Las Vegas (2007), Medium (2007), K-Ville (2007), Ghost Whisperer (2007), Cashmere Mafia (four episodes 2008), NCIS (2010), and White Collar (2010).

From 2009 to 2014, Levering played the role of Kim Kaswell in Lifetime's comedy-drama series Drop Dead Diva. Levering also has starred in independent films: Like Dandelion Dust in 2009, and Breaking the Girls in 2012.

In 2016, Levering was cast as the adult Annette Hargrove in the NBC drama Cruel Intentions, based on the 1999 film of same name. The role was played by Reese Witherspoon in the film.

Personal life
Levering married businessman Reza Jahangiri on April 20, 2013 at The Beverly Hills Hotel. Their son, Holden Robert Jahangiri, was born in July 2013. Kate's pregnancy was written into her role on Drop Dead Diva. In March 2016, Levering announced that she had given birth to a second son.

Filmography

References

External links
 
 
  (archive)

1979 births
Living people
20th-century American actresses
21st-century American actresses
Actresses from Sacramento, California
American film actresses
American musical theatre actresses
American stage actresses
American television actresses